Jun Märkl (born 11 February 1959 in Munich) is a German conductor.

Biography
Born to a Japanese pianist mother and a German violinist father, Märkl studied piano and the violin as a youth. Beginning in 1978 at the Musikhochschule Hannover he continued his piano and violin studies and also began to study conducting. He later attended the University of Michigan where his mentors included Gustav Meier. He was also a pupil of Sergiu Celibidache. He later won a conducting stipend to Tanglewood, where he was under the tutelage of Leonard Bernstein and Seiji Ozawa.

From 1991 to 1994, Märkl served as Music Director of the Saarländisches Staatstheater in Saarbrücken. From 1994 to 2000, he was Generalmusikdirector and director of opera at the Mannheim National Theatre. In the U.S. he made his Metropolitan Opera conducting debut in February 1999 with Il trovatore, and returned in December 2000 with Turandot.

In 2005, Märkl became music director of the Orchestre National de Lyon (ONL). With the ONL, he has conducted several recordings for the Naxos label, including music of Claude Debussy, Maurice Ravel, and Olivier Messiaen. Märkl concluded his ONL tenure in 2011.  In September 2007, he became principal conductor of the MDR Symphony Orchestra in Leipzig.  Märkl resigned from this post after the 2011-2012 season.

Märkl became musical advisor to the Basque National Orchestra (Orquesta de Euskadi) effective with the 2014-2015 season.  In November 2014, the orchestra elevated Märkl's title to chief conductor with immediate effect, through the 2015-2016 season.  He concluded his tenure with the Basque National Orchestra in June 2017. In May 2019, the Residentie Orchestra announced the appointment of Märkl as its co-principal guest conductor, effective in 2021.

Outside of Europe, in October 2020, the Taiwan Philharmonic announced the appointment of Märkl as its next artistic adviser, effective August 2021.  In December 2020, the Malaysian Philharmonic Orchestra announced the appointment of Märkl as its next music director, effective with the 2021 season.  In May 2021, the Indianapolis Symphony Orchestra announced the appointment of Märkl as its artistic advisor for the 2021-2022 season.

References

External links
 Official webpage of Jun Märkl
 MusicVine agency biography of Jun Märkl
 Jun Märkl discography at Naxos Records
 Robert Hugill, Review of Naxos 8.572174.  Music Web International website, 10 March 2010

1959 births
Living people
German male conductors (music)
German people of Japanese descent
Hochschule für Musik, Theater und Medien Hannover alumni
University of Michigan School of Music, Theatre & Dance alumni
21st-century German conductors (music)
21st-century German male musicians